Medicina generale  is an Italian medical drama television series.

Cast
 Nicole Grimaudo: Anna Morelli
 Andrea Di Stefano: Giacomo Pogliani
 Roberto Citran: Mario Bergamini
 Marco Giallini: Alfredo Danzi
 Fabrizia Sacchi: Gabriella Boschi
 Antonello Fassari: Angelo De Santis
 Giampiero Judica: Dottor Sassi
 Francesca Reggiani: Olga
 Euridice Axen: Letizia Conti
 Thomas Trabacchi: Elia Lorenzi
 Michele Alhaique: Marco 
 Guido Caprino: Andrea Lecci 
 Yorgo Voyagis: Vittorio Pogliani

See also
List of Italian television series

External links
 

Italian medical television series
2000s Italian drama television series
2010s Italian drama television series
2008 Italian television series debuts
2010 Italian television series endings
RAI original programming